The Synchronized Swimming Competition at the 1963 Pan American Games was held from April 20 to May 5, 1963 in São Paulo, Brazil. There were three medal events after the exclusion of the sport in the 1959 Pan American Games.

Solo

Duet

Team

Medal table

References
 
 Sports 123

1963
1963 Pan American Games
1963 in water sports